Tamiahua is a municipality located in the northern part of the state of Veracruz in Mexico. It covers an area of 985.4 km2. It is located at the southern end of the Tamiahua Lagoon. The name may come from the Náhuatl language Tla-mia-hua-c: "In the flowers of maize of the land"; or Huasteco, Tam-yan-ja: "Place of great waters".

Geographic Limits

The municipality of  Tamiahua  is delimited to the north by Ozuluama and Tampico Alto, to the east by Gulf of Mexico, to the south by Temapache and Tuxpam de Rodríguez Cano, and to the west by Tamalín, Chinampa de Gorostiza, Naranjos Amatlán, Tancoco and Cerro Azul. Its development has allowed the creation of two wharves and two piers, and the municipality has established industries between two medians emphasizing the production of oysters.

Agriculture & Fishing

The town produces principally maize, beans, green chile and orange fruit. Along the coastline fresh seafood, including shrimp, crabs, and oysters, is harvested and attracts tourism to the area.

Celebrations

In July,  Tamiahua  holds celebrations in honor of Santiago Apostol, patron of the town, and in December there is a celebration in honor of the Virgin of Guadalupe.

Weather

The weather in  Tamiahua  is very warm and wet all year with rains in summer and autumn.

References

External links 

  Municipal Official webpage
   Municipal Official Information]

Municipalities of Veracruz